Cheap Trick is an American rock band from Rockford, Illinois, formed in 1974.

Cheap Trick may also refer to:
 Cheap Trick (1977 album)
 Cheap Trick (1997 album)

See also